Meredith Francis Maguire (2 September 1929 – 5 March 1981) was an Irish Republican who became an Independent Member of the British Parliament. Born into an Irish Republican family, he was interned during his youth for Irish Republican Army activities; while he later opposed violence, he remained close to the Republican movement. He was running Frank's Bar, a public house in Lisnaskea, County Fermanagh, when in October 1974 he was elected as a unity candidate to represent Fermanagh and South Tyrone. While not an abstentionist, Maguire's attendances at Westminster were infrequent and he never made a full speech, but he did cast some crucial votes to support the Labour government of the 1970s. He is famous for "abstaining in person" in the no confidence vote against the Callaghan government, which brought it down by a single vote.

Early life 
Born in Gort, County Galway, and educated in Athlone, Maguire worked in his youth in a pub owned by his uncle, future Nationalist Party politician John Carron. He was attracted to the cause of Irish Republicanism and was interned without trial in Crumlin Road Jail in Belfast for two years, within which he was the Irish Republican Army Commanding Officer. After his release, he opposed violence and became a pub landlord himself. He did remain associated with Sinn Féin.

Political career 
In the Fermanagh and South Tyrone constituency there was a close balance between Irish Nationalist and Republican, and Unionist voters. In the February 1974 UK general election, the Nationalist/Republican vote was split between a Unity and a Social Democratic and Labour Party (SDLP) candidate, leading to victory for the Ulster Unionist Party (UUP) candidate. With the aim of fielding a single candidate, discussions among nationalist and republicans in the constituencies agreed Maguire as a joint candidate - in what has been termed the spirit of the Unity movement.

Election to UK Parliament
Maguire was elected in the October 1974 general election with more than half the vote. On 31 October 1974 he swore the Oath of Allegiance to Queen Elizabeth II. Although not an abstentionist, he rarely attended the House of Commons. He did attend for the 1979 vote of no confidence in the government of James Callaghan to, as he wryly told a journalist, "abstain in person".

At the resulting 1979 general election, Maguire was re-elected against candidates from the SDLP, the UUP, and the United Ulster Unionist Party.

Death 
Maguire's death in 1981 (due to a heart attack) produced a by-election which was won by Bobby Sands, an IRA hunger striker who died within a month of being elected.

See also 
Owen Carron
Lisnaskea
Fermanagh

References

 'Who's Who of British MPs: Volume IV, 1945-1979' by Michael Stenton and Stephen Lees (Harvester, Brighton, 1979)

External links 
 
The Night the Government Fell, BBC archive on the 1979 vote of confidence, including photo of Maguire

1929 births
1981 deaths
Members of the Parliament of the United Kingdom for Fermanagh and South Tyrone (since 1950)
Independent politicians in Northern Ireland
Independent members of the House of Commons of the United Kingdom
UK MPs 1974–1979
UK MPs 1979–1983
People from Lisnaskea
Politicians from County Galway
People from County Fermanagh
Drinking establishment owners